Reamonn was a German pop rock band fronted by local-based Irish singer/songwriter Rea Garvey. Formed in 1999, they have recorded and released a total of six full-length studio albums which were highly successful in Germany and also saw some success in other European countries. They gained recognition in 2000 with their song "Supergirl" from their debut album Tuesday. The band has been on an indefinite hiatus since 2012.

History

The 1990s: Forming and first contract 
In 1997, Rea Garvey left his band The Reckless Pedestrians and home town of Tralee, Ireland to go to Germany with not a lot of money and a demo CD in his pocket. He put an ad into local paper Stockacher Anzeiger stating, "Singer requires band for recording and live shows". Mike Gommeringer (Gomezz) saw this ad and accurately assumed it must have been Garvey, whose original band he had once seen play live. The two met up and subsequently recruited Uwe, Sebi and Phil. Their first gig was played on New Year's Eve 1998 in Stockach. Reamonn is an Irish form of the name Raymond.

In order to secure a recording contract, they set up a showcase at Logo, a small club in Hamburg, in front of 16 representatives from various record labels in 1999. The band was quickly offered several contracts, settling on signing with Virgin Records Germany. In 2006, they switched to Universal Music.

The 2000s: Breakthrough with Supergirl 
Reamonn's first chart success came with "Supergirl," a track that received heavy airplay on mainstream radio stations in Germany, the Netherlands, Switzerland, Austria and Russia. Taken from the album "Tuesday," it reached the top 10 in 2000 in each of those countries.

The track "Alright" is perhaps one of the signature songs from Reamonn's early period. Performing at the Roxy in Hollywood, California, to impress record executives, the band played the song twice. Alas, the crowd was sparse, as most of the action was at the Viper Room to catch then-hot British talent Jem.

Reamonn never got the U.S. deal, however, back in Europe, their popularity continued to soar with a mix of radio-friendly sounds. To date, their most successful "international" single is "Tonight" from the album "Wish". Released in summer 2006, the track hit No. 1 in Romania, but did not crack the top 10 in Germany. The track also opened Reamonn up to new markets, such as Greece and Portugal, where the band continues to receive airplay.

On 7 July 2007, the band performed at the German leg of Live Earth in Hamburg's HSH Nordbank Arena. The same year, Garvey provided vocals for trance DJ Paul van Dyk's song "Let Go".

On 24 July 2008, the group was chosen as the opening act for Barack Obama's speech at The Siegessäule in Berlin, before an estimated crowd of 200,000. The band made the then-US Senator an honorary Reamonn member, presenting him with a band ring.

On 20 December 2008, Reamonn played their song "Faith" as an entrance theme for boxer Nikolai Valuev leading up to his WBA championship fight versus Evander Holyfield in Zürich.

"Faith" was also the official song of the 2009 Deutsche Tourenwagen Masters season.

In November 2009, Reamonn went on a world tour with Status Quo as a support band.

The 2010s: Breakup and new projects 
On 27 August 2010, Reamonn released their Best Of album "Eleven", which features three new tracks: the new singles "Yesterday", "Colder" and "Let The Morning Sleep". Each of the album's two disks features 11 songs taken from every album Reamonn have recorded. The Deluxe Edition features a DVD with all the videos and some live tracks. In December 2010, Reamonn released their DVD "Eleven: Live At The Casino". Later on, the members decided to concentrate on other musical projects.

Rea Garvey's first solo single is called "Can't Stand the Silence" and was released on 9 September 2011. The album of the same name was released on 30 September 2011. Later, "Can't Stand the Silence: The Encore Edition" was released, featuring a few new songs including the single "Wild Love". The tour in support of the album consisted of dates in Germany during 2011 and 2012, and continued on in 2013 with new dates also outside Germany: in Switzerland, France, Ireland, the UK, Austria, Belgium, Luxembourg and the Netherlands. For the 2013 dates, Ryan Sheridan was the support act.

Rea Garvey released his second solo album called "Pride" in May 2014. The album features the single "Can't Say No". In September 2014, Rea Garvey released the "Oh My Love" EP, which features the original song and a new version with Amy Macdonald.

Rea Garvey is also a member of the jury for The Voice of Germany.

The other members of Reamonn teamed up with Thomas Hanreich, the former frontman of Vivid, to form the band Stereolove. They released their first album "Stereo Loves You" in September 2012 and their second album "Boy A" in 2015.

Members 
The members are
 Lead vocals, guitar: Rea Garvey, born as Raymond Michael Garvey on 
 Guitar: Uwe Bossert, born 
 Beats: Mike "Gomezz" Gommeringer, born 26 September 1973
 Bass: Philipp "Phil" Rauenbusch, born 7 May 1973
 Keyboard, saxophone, flute: Sebastian "Sebi" Padotzke, born

Discography 

 Tuesday (2000)
 Dream No. 7 (2001)
 Beautiful Sky (2003)
 Wish (2006)
 Reamonn (2008)
 Eleven (2010)

References

External links 

Official website
Reamonn on Facebook

German musical groups
Musical groups established in 1999
English-language singers from Germany
1999 establishments in Germany